Glenn Hedden (born January 4, 1950) is a former head football coach and athletic director for the Kean University Cougars in Union, New Jersey. In his two seasons as head coach (1987–88), he compiled a record of 13–8 and led the Cougars to their first ever New Jersey Athletic Conference title in his first year on the job. Prior to Kean, Hedden was an assistant football coach at Montclair State University for 11 years.

At Montclair State, he acquired a B.A. in both physical education and health, and a master's degree in administration. Hedden is currently living in Manasquan, New Jersey with his wife Deborah.

Head coaching record

References

1950 births
Living people
Kean Cougars athletic directors
Kean Cougars football coaches
Montclair State Red Hawks football coaches
Montclair State University alumni
People from Manasquan, New Jersey